The Dunlop-Metropolitan Tournament was an invitation professional golf tournament played in South East England. It was founded in 1934. The tournament was played towards the end of the season and was played over 72 holes of stroke play. The event had a small field; entry being mostly based on high finishes in important British and Continental events earlier in the year. Past Open Champions were also invited. The tournament was informally called "The Championship of Champions" and was "equivalent almost to the Masters' tournament of America" which was also founded in 1934.

After World War II the event was continued as the Dunlop Masters which started in 1946 and was a similar 72-hole end-of-season event with a restricted field.

History
The first tournament was played on 11 and 12 October 1934 on the New Course at Walton Heath Golf Club, contested by a field of 53. Ernest Whitcombe led after the first day, with two rounds of 69. After a 68 on the second morning his lead increased to eight and despite a final round of 77 he won by four strokes. There was no cut. Prize money amounted to £500.

It was planned to play the event again on 24 and 25 September 1935. With the Ryder Cup team leaving for America on 14 September and an earlier date not being possible, the tournament was cancelled.

The second tournament was played from 22–24 September 1936 on the West Course at Wentworth with a field of 62. Arthur Lacey led on the first day with a 70, a new record for the altered course. Henry Cotton broke this with a 68 on the second day and was tied with Lacey for the lead on 140. 33 players scoring 155 or better played 36 holes on the final day. Cotton scored 70, Lacey 75 and Reg Whitcombe, playing with Cotton, scored 68 to take second place, four behind Cotton. Jimmy Adams set a new record with a 67. In the final round Cotton's 71 gave him a three shot win over Whitcombe (70) and Lacey (69). Charles Whitcombe finished fourth, a distant nine shots behind Cotton.

The third tournament was played on 21 and 22 September 1937, again on the West Course at Wentworth. The field consisted of the winners, runners-up, other players who had finished in "prominent positions" in the important 1937 events, together with a number of Open Championship winners, 36 players in all. The field included 69-year-old Sandy Herd, the 1904 Open champion. On the first day Reg Whitcombe led on 138, having set a new course record of 66 in the morning round. Whitcombe scored 72 on the second morning and was level on 210 with Arthur Lacey with Henry Cotton and Paddy Mahon on 213. Whitcombe struggled with a final round 76 and Lacey's 67 gave him a 5 stroke victory. Bill Laidlaw equalled the course record with a final round 66.

The fourth tournament was played on 20 and 21 September 1938 on the West Course at Wentworth. 29 players qualified. Prize money was increased from £500 to £750. In wet conditions Alf Perry led after the first day on 137 (69-68), six ahead of second place Jimmy Adams. Perry had rounds of 67 and 69 on the second day to win comfortably. Henry Cotton was his only challenger after a course record 64 in the third round.

The 1939 tournament was planned to be played at Wentworth on 19 and 20 September 1939 but was cancelled because of the start of World War II.

Winners

Between 1933 and 1937 Dunlop also sponsored a number of sectional tournaments. The format varied but was often a 36-hole or match-play event. The events were sometimes qualifying events for the Dunlop-Metropolitan Tournament.

Dunlop-Scottish Tournament

Winners:
1933:  Jimmy McDowall
1934:   Mark Seymour
1935:   Mark Seymour
1936:  George Knight
1937:  Laurie Ayton, Snr

Dunlop-Irish Tournament

Winners:
1933:  Willie Nolan and  Pat O'Connor (tied)
1934:  Willie Nolan
1935:  Pat O'Connor
1936:  Paddy Mahon
1937:  John McKenna

Dunlop-Welsh Tournament

Winners:
1934:  Frank Hill
1935:  Frank Hill and  Edward Musty (tied)
1936:  Frank Hill
1937:  Fred Healing and  Ken Williams (tied)

Dunlop-Eastern Tournament

Winners:
1934:  Ernest Riseborough
1935:  James Sherlock 
1936:  James Sherlock
1937: DR Harper

Dunlop-Midland Professional Championship

Winners:
1934:  Charlie Ward
1935:  Bill Firkins
1936:  Bill Branch
1937:  Freddie Beck

In these years Dunlop sponsored the Midland Professional Championship which has been contested since 1898.

Dunlop-Northern Tournament

Winners:
1934:  D. C. Jones and Jack Moffat (tied)
1935:  Dick Burton
1936:  Albert Chevalier and  Ernest Smith (tied)
1937:  Bert Gadd

Dunlop-Southern Tournament

Winners:
1934:  Abe Mitchell
1935:  Allan Dailey
1936:  Sam King
1937:  Sam King

Dunlop-West of England Tournament

Winners:
1934:  Syd Easterbrook
1935:  Fred Jewell
1936:  Reg Whitcombe
1937:  Reg Whitcombe

References

Golf tournaments in England